Loginovo is the name of several rural localities in Russia:
Loginovo, Mozhaysky District, Moscow Oblast, a village in Mozhaysky District of Moscow Oblast
Loginovo, Pavlovo-Posadsky District, Moscow Oblast, a village in Pavlovo-Posadsky District of Moscow Oblast
Loginovo, Solnechnogorsky District, Moscow Oblast, a village in Solnechnogorsky District of Moscow Oblast
Loginovo, Pskov Oblast, a village in Pskov Oblast
Loginovo, name of several other rural localities